Salinibacterium is a Gram-positive, aerobic, non-spore-forming and non-motile bacterial genus from the family Microbacteriaceae.

References

Further reading 
 
 
 

Microbacteriaceae
Bacteria genera